Haplobasidion musae, also known as the Malayan leaf spot, is an ascomycete fungus that is a plant pathogen. It was first described M. B. Ellis in 1957.

References

External links 
 Index Fungorum
 USDA ARS Fungal Database

Ascomycota enigmatic taxa
Fungal plant pathogens and diseases